This article contains a list of the most studied restriction enzymes whose names start with Bst to Bv inclusive.  It contains approximately 200 enzymes.

The following information is given:



Whole list navigation

Restriction enzymes

Bst

Bsu - Bv

Notes

Biotechnology
Restriction enzyme cutting sites
Restriction enzymes